The Mercedes-Benz 600 (W100) is a line of ultra-luxury cars produced by Daimler-Benz from 1963 to 1981. The forerunner of the modern Maybach marque, the Grosser Mercedes ("Grand Mercedes") succeeded the Type 300d "Adenauer" as the company's flagship model. It was positioned above the 300-series Mercedes-Benz W112 in price, amenities, and status. Its few competitors included British and American equivalents such as Rolls-Royce, Bentley, Lincoln Continental, Cadillac Series 75, and Imperial. It was well known for its ownership among celebrities and political leaders throughout the late 20th century.

Generally, the short-wheelbase (SWB) models were designed to be owner-driven, whereas the long-wheelbase (LWB) and limousine models, often incorporating a central divider with power window, were intended for chauffeur operation.

History 
The 600 replaced the Mercedes-Benz W189 limousine, which was nicknamed the Adenauer, after Konrad Adenauer, who employed several of these during his term as the first West German chancellor.

Production began in 1964 and continued through to 1981. During this time, production totalled 2,677 units, comprising 2,190 Saloons, 304 Pullmans, 124 6-door Pullmans and 59 Landaulets.

The 600 succeeded the 1961 Mercedes-Benz W112 in using a pneumatic self-levelling suspension, an enhancement of the Mercedes-Benz 300d Adenauer's dashboard activated mechanical torsion bar based system. A version is incorporated in Mercedes' current Active Body Control.

With its demise in 1981, the 600 marked the last ultra-luxury model that the brand produced in an unbroken line since the model 60 hp Simplex from 1903. The company would return to this segment some 20 years later with the Maybach 57/62 (but the Maybach was extremely expensive), but these cars ultimately failed to captivate customers in the same way as their British rivals. As a result, Daimler ended production of the Maybach brand in 2012 and has not returned to this segment. , the Mercedes flagship is the Mercedes-Maybach S-Class, which occupies a considerably lower price bracket and is not a true successor to the 600 and earlier models. However, it is seen as a spiritual successor, since it is the first luxury Mercedes since the 600 to feature some bespoke design touches not available on the standard S-Class.

Models
The 600 came in two main variants:
 A short wheelbase 4-door saloon, available with a power divider window separating the front seats from the rear bench seat, although most were built without this feature.
 A long wheelbase 4-door "Pullman" limousine (with two additional rear-facing seats separated from the driver compartment by a power divider window, of which 304 were built), and a 6-door limousine (with two forward-facing jump-seats at the middle two doors and a rear bench-seat).

A number of the limousines were made as landaulets, with a convertible top over the rear passenger compartment. Two versions of the convertible roof were made: long roof and short roof. Of them, the short roof, which opens only above the last, third row of seats, is the more common version. Rarer, especially with the 6-door landaulets, is the long roof, called the Presidential roof. In all, 59 landaulets were produced, and of them, only 26 were 6-door landaulets. Of these 26, only nine were 6-doors landaulets with the long Presidential-type roof. One of these nine cars was used by the former Yugoslavian president Josip Broz Tito, and it was sold in 2017 in England, for £2.5 million.

Landaulets like these were also notably used by the German government, as during the 1965 state visit of Queen Elizabeth II. The Vatican, in addition to an elongated Mercedes 300d 4-door landaulet, used for the Pope a specially designed Mercedes 600 4-door landaulet, which now resides at the Mercedes-Benz Museum in Stuttgart. Production of the landaulet versions of the 600 ended in 1980.

Mercedes also made two special 600 coupés: one as a gift for retiring long-time Mercedes chief designer Rudolf Uhlenhaut, and the other for Fritz Nallinger, head of the Mercedes research and development centre in the 1950s and 60s. These cars had a wheelbase 22 cm (8.6 inches) shorter than the SWB saloon. A third coupé was much later constructed by Karl Middelhauve from a SWB saloon. Karl Middelhauve also created a questionable pair of matching Chevrolet El Camino-style coupes from 600 SWB saloons, one of them with a Vortech supercharger. A single example of a SWB 4-door landaulet, combining the handling of a short-wheelbase with the qualities of a landaulet, was built by Mercedes in 1967 for former racing driver Philipp Constantin von Berckheim.

Mechanical
The 600's great size, weight, and numerous hydraulically driven amenities required more power than Mercedes'  largest engine at that time, the 3-litre 6-cylinder M189, could produce. A new V8 with more than twice the capacity was developed, the 6.3 L M100. It featured single overhead camshafts (SOHC) and a Bosch-made intermittently injecting multipoint manifold injection. It developed .

The 600's complex  hydraulic pressure system powered the automobile's windows, seats, sun-roof, boot lid, and automatically closing doors. Adjustable air suspension delivered excellent ride quality and sure handling over any road surface.

In 1968 the M-100 engine and pneumatic suspension were fitted to the much smaller but still substantial W109 300SEL 6.3, creating the world's fastest four-door saloon. In 1975 a larger 6.9 litre version of M-100 was installed in the W116 Mercedes-Benz 450SEL 6.9 and air suspension was replaced with a hydraulic suspension.

Notable owners
Famous owners of the Mercedes-Benz 600 have included the following people.

Celebrities and tycoons
 Aristotle Onassis
 Bob Jane
 Bobby Womack asserts that Janis Joplin was inspired to the song Mercedes Benz after a ride with him in his new 600 
 Coco Chanel
 David Bowie
 Eric Clapton
 Elizabeth Taylor
 Elvis Presley
 Frank Packer
 Florian Schneider
 George Harrison
 Herbert von Karajan
 Hugh Hefner
 John Lennon
 Jay Kay
 Jack Nicholson
 Jay Leno, who had his 600 (a 1972 SWB) fitted with a supercharger by Karl Middelhauve, making it the only 600 Kompressor in existence
 Jeremy Clarkson
 Johannes, 11th Prince of Thurn and Taxis
 Karen Carpenter
 Mireille Mathieu
 Pete Townshend owns a six-door version
 Ringo Starr
 Ronnie Wood
 Rowan Atkinson
 Robert Wood Johnson III
 Udo Jürgens

Politicians and royalty
 Anastasio Somoza Debayle, President of Nicaragua bought a SWB for his wife Hope Portocarrero from the first production run.
 Bhumibol Adulyadej, King of Thailand
 Chen Yi, former Chinese Foreign Minister
 Daniel Moi
 Deng Xiaoping
 Deng Yingchao, wife of Zhou Enlai, the first Chinese Prime Minister
 Enver Hoxha
 François "Papa Doc" Duvalier
 Francois Tombalbaye
 Ferdinand Marcos, who owned four, including a landaulet, a 1981 bulletproof model and a six-door version
 F. W. de Klerk

 Habib Bourguiba, President of Tunisia
 Hassan II of Morocco, King of Morocco
 Hastings Kamuzu Banda
 Hosni Mubarak
 Idi Amin
 Jim Fouché
 Josip Broz Tito, 1971 Pullman landaulet
 Jean-Bédel Bokassa
 Jean-Claude Duvalier
 John Vorster
 Jomo Kenyatta
 King Khalid of Saudi Arabia
 Kim Il-sung
 Kim Jong-il
 Kim Jong-un; the North Koreans have also owned a landaulet (both seen in the 65th anniversary parade in Pyongyang on October 10, 2010)
 Leonid Brezhnev
 Léopold Sédar Senghor, President of Senegal; the first Senegalese regime (1960–1980) under him had three 600s, a short wheel base, a long wheel base, and a Landaulet, later replaced by the W126-based Carat Limousine.
 Shah Mohammad Reza Pahlavi of Iran and the royal court, who owned multiple 600 models including 3 landaulet models and 18 other for national guard
 King Mohammed VI of Morocco
 Muhammad Zia Ul Haq  (12 August 1924 – 17 August 1988) was a Pakistani four-star general who served as the President of Pakistan from 1978 until his death in 1988. Also kept the same 1970 Pullman 600 as the holder of the Prime Minister Office.
 Mao Zedong, Chinese revolutionary leader
 Marais Viljoen
 Mobutu Sese Seko, dictator and president of the Democratic Republic of the Congo (Zaire) 
 Nico Diederichs
 Nicolae Ceaușescu
 Norodom Sihanouk, former King of Cambodia
 Omar Bongo President of Gabon.

 The Pope
 Park Chung-hee
 P. W. Botha
 Religious leader Guru Maharaj Ji/Prem Rawat
 Colombian drug dealer Pablo Escobar, a LWB 4-door, destroyed in an attack on Escobar in 1993 in Medellín
 Robert Mugabe
 Saddam Hussein, who owned a long-roof landaulet that was recovered after the fall of Baghdad and is today owned by the Petersen Automotive Museum in Los Angeles
 Silvio Berlusconi, Prime Minister of Italy
 Süleyman Demirel, 9th President of Turkey
 Todor Zhivkov Former President of Bulgaria from 1956 to 1989. Used Government owned high-end Benz models from 300D Adenauer to 450 SEL 6.9 for daily routine, and for State visits- 1967 600 Pullman 6-door Landaulet. The 600 Landaulet is still in use today by Bulgarian Government for Special occasions and visits.
 Zulfiqar Ali Bhutto (5 January 1928 – 4 April 1979) was a Pakistani politician who served as the 9th Prime Minister of Pakistan from 1973 to 1977, and prior to that as the 4th President of Pakistan from 1971 to 1973. He kept a 1970 Pullman 600 for Prime Minister Office use.

In popular culture

In cinema, the Mercedes 600 was featured in several James Bond films, most notably as transport of the villain Ernst Stavro Blofeld in On Her Majesty's Secret Service and Diamonds Are Forever. In Octopussy, the villain Kamal Khan is seen leaving Sotheby's London auction house in a 600 Pullman. Near the beginning of 1978 movie Who Is Killing the Great Chefs of Europe?, the character played by Jacqueline Bisset is abducted from Heathrow Airport in a 600 Pullman.

In television, a 600 was used by fictional Channing/Gioberti family matriarch Angela Channing in the American television series Falcon Crest. Images of the car driving from San Francisco over the Golden Gate Bridge to the Falcon Crest vineyard were featured in the opening credits of the first four seasons. It was also prominently featured in the television show Friday the 13th.

In a Top gear challenge, Jeremy Clarkson compared his 1973 600 to James May's 1972 Rolls-Royce Corniche.

The limousine and landaulet versions of the 600 is favored by various heads of state, particularly dictators and monarchs during the 1960s and 1970s. This is similar to how its predecessor, the 770 limousine, was associated with Nazi Germany, being used as the official state car of Adolf Hitler.

There was also a Pullman version used in the movie High Anxiety by Mel Brooks.

A red 1972 Pullman was seen in The Princess Diaries 2: Royal Engagement.

Prince Ital Joe and Marky Mark are seen driving a 600 in the music video for their single "United".

A green 600 serves as the ride for Selena Gomez through the streets of Paris in her 2013 music video for "Slow Down."

Several 600s are seen in several episodes of Amazon's original series The Man in the High Castle, transporting Nazi officials.

Jack Nicholson's character drives a red 600 in The Witches of Eastwick.

In X-Men: The Last Stand, Charles Xavier and Erik Lehnsherr arrive in a black 600.

Technical data
Technical data Mercedes-Benz 600 (W100) (Manufacturer's figures except where stated)

References

Notes

Bibliography

General

Workshop manuals

External links

 Mercedes-Benz 600 – historical information at Daimler.com
 The International M-100 Group (with a car registry by serial number)
 Photos of the 1965 papal landaulet at Conceptcarz.com
 Presentation of the 600 SWB at Amelia Island, Florida - video
 Jay Leno's Garage – 1972 Mercedes-Benz 600 - video

600
Cars introduced in 1963
Rear-wheel-drive vehicles
1960s cars
1970s cars
1980s cars
Limousines
Luxury vehicles
Flagship vehicles